"Nobody Does It Betta" is a song performed by Mint Condition, issued as the lead single from their second album From the Mint Factory. The song was produced by the band and written by the band's lead singer Stokley Williams. It peaked at #45 on the Billboard R&B chart in 1993.

The song's music video was directed by Antoine Fuqua.

Chart positions

References

1993 singles
Mint Condition (band) songs
Perspective Records singles
Songs written by Stokley Williams
Music videos directed by Antoine Fuqua